You Wish may refer to:

You Wish! (film), a Disney Channel Original Movie
"You Wish!" (song), a song by Lalaine from the film's soundtrack
"You Wish", a song by Vixen from the album Live & Learn
You Wish (TV series), an American sitcom